The 2018–2022 Nicaraguan protests began on 18 April 2018 when demonstrators in several cities of Nicaragua began protests against the social security reforms decreed by President Daniel Ortega that increased taxes and decreased benefits. After five days of unrest in which nearly thirty people were killed, Ortega announced the cancellation of the reforms; however, the opposition has grown through the 2014–2018 Nicaraguan protests to denounce Ortega and demand his resignation, becoming one of the largest protests in his government's history and the deadliest civil conflict since the end of the Nicaraguan Revolution. On 29 September 2018, political demonstrations were declared illegal by President Ortega.

Background

Pensions for small contributors 
The 2014–2018 Nicaraguan protests began in June 2013 when some elderly people with only a small contribution (less than 750 weeks) demanded a reduced pension from the Nicaraguan Social Security Institute. Soon, students and young people joined their protests. After a week of demonstration, the peaceful protesters were attacked by paramilitary groups associated with the Sandinista Youth, while police had moved back only moments before. Later, to calm down the protests, concessions to the pensioners were made by president Daniel Ortega to supply a reduced pension.

Proposed canal 
Over a year later protests started again, this time opposing the construction of a proposed Chinese-funded inter-oceanic canal through Nicaragua, with environmental impact, land use, and indigenous rights, as well as Nicaraguan sovereignty among the chief concerns of demonstrators. By February 2018, the project was widely viewed as defunct, though a 60% absent vote to revoke the 2013 legislation creating the project, the Chinese company (HKND) granted the concession to develop the canal maintains legal rights to it as well as to ancillary infrastructure projects.

Forest fires 
In early April 2018, demonstrators marched in Managua, the country's capital, to protest what they regarded as an insufficient government response to forest fires that burned 13,500 acres (5,500 hectares) of the Indio Maíz Biological Reserve, a tropical nature preserve that is home to Rama and Kriol indigenous people, as well as significant biodiversity and endangered species. There were suspicions that the government had an interest in the fire, as it is the largest natural reserve through which the Nicaraguan Canal is planned to make. Counterprotests also occurred at the time in support of the Sandinista Front government.

INSS crisis 
In 2013, the Nicaraguan Social Security Institute was in a deficit situation that had been growing annually, reaching 2,371 million Nicaraguan córdobas by the end of 2017. This deficit had increased by over 50% annually for the last two years. The IMF alerted Nicaragua in 2017 that in the absence of the reform, the cash reserves would be depleted by 2019. The government of Daniel Ortega prepared a reform plan for the INSS based on the IMF's report. The government rejected some of the proposed remedies, such as increasing the retirement age, arguing that older people have fewer possibilities of finding employment, and that the urgency of the reform required fast results to ensure the INSS's viability, as some measures suggested by the IMF would not yield results for three or four years.

In early April 2018, the Superior Council for Private Enterprise (COSEP) announced the start of negotiations with the government to reform the INSS, declaring that the solution must include an increase to the contribution of the employers and employees, as well as fiscal reform. These negotiations excluded small and medium-sized enterprises. 
The reforms were announced on 16 April 2018, and published by presidential decree in March 2018 in La Gaceta (official government record) on 18 April 2018. The reform included an incremental increase of 0.75% (from 6.25% to 7%) on the employee contribution and 2% (from 19% to 21%) on the employers, starting July 2018. The employers' contribution would increase annually until reaching 22.5% in 2020. Pensions would also be taxed 5%. The 5% tax has been criticized as unconstitutional, since only the National Assembly has the power of taxation, and Law 160, signed by Ortega, indicates that pensions are not subject to any retentions.

The government-aligned unions Workers' National Front and the Employees National Union supported the reform, while the COSEP rejected it, indicating it did not have consensus and filed a writ of amparo in an attempt to reverse it.

2018 protests 

Citizens protested on 18 April after already being angered by the handling of the fires in response to the Ortega administration's announcement of social security reforms that raised income and payroll taxes while reducing pension benefits by 5%. Demonstrations involving mostly elderly individuals, university students, and other activists broke out in Managua and six other cities, which were repressed by authorities reporting to President Ortega. Authorities were seen using live ammunition on protesters while also arming Sandinista Youth members with weapons. At least 26 people were killed, including journalist  of the news program Meridiano, with Gahona being shot to death outside of the city hall in Bluefields while streaming on Facebook Live.  Various forms of independent media were censored during the protests.

Protests began to intensify with confrontations occurring in León, Managua, Granada, Boaco, Carazo, Estelí, Rivas, Matagalpa and Masaya. TELCOR ordered the suspension of transmissions of four independent TV channels that were reporting the news: channels 12, 23, 51, and 100% Noticias. Also the Catholic Episcopal Conference's TV channel. The suspension lasted several hours, except for 100% Noticias, who was off the air until 25 April. Ortega announced the cancellation of the social security reforms on 22 April, acknowledging they were not viable and had created a "dramatic situation". 

More than 10 cities were the scene of heavy fighting on 12 May in at least eight departments in the north, center, and Pacific areas of Nicaragua. The biggest clashes took place in Chinandega, Granada, León, Managua, Masaya, and Rivas in the Pacific, as well as Estelí and Matagalpa in the north. In Masaya, the clashes lasted for more than 12 hours between demonstrators, anti-riot police and youth shock groups of the Sandinista party. 

After weeks of conflict, a "national dialogue" began on 16 May 2018. A delegation from the Inter-American Commission on Human Rights (IACHR) arrived in Nicaragua on 17 May to observe in loco the situation of human rights in the country. The IACHR visit occurred as Nicaraguan human rights organizations were reporting between 61 and 67 people dead and more than 500 injured in the repression exercised against protesters.

On 18 May, the second day of dialogue, the IACHR (now included in talks) called on the government of Nicaragua to "immediately cease the repression of the protest" and "to guarantee the independence and functioning of the media in the country", and said that the IACHR mission would be observing the human rights sittation in the country and meeting with all sectors of society. There was friction between university students and members of the state-media press before the dialogue. The government and the opposition agreed to a truce over the weekend, a month after having started demonstrations and protests. Several people appeared before the Inter-American Commission to lodge complaints against the violations carried out by the police forces and supporters of the government.

The national dialogue continued on its third day on 21 May. The resignation of Ortega and his wife and of the government was requested in order to return the country to normality. The IACHR issued a preliminary report on the investigations of what happened in the protests. The IACHR counted at least 76 people killed in the protests and more than 800 injured, and denounced serious events and violations of human rights by the government. The representatives of the organization were in Managua, Masaya, León and Matagalpa.

A week after starting, the National Dialogue between the government and students, the private sector and civil society was suspended indefinitely. The leader of the Nicaraguan Catholic Church, Bishop Leopoldo Brenes, who had acted as a mediator of this dialogue, explained that the lack of agreement on an agenda of issues to be discussed prevented negotiations from continuing.

On 30 May, Mother's Day in Nicaragua, a march was held in honor of the victims killed during the protests. It was repressed by the national police in the company of paramilitary groups and pro-government mobs, leaving approximately 15 dead. Most of the victims died from accurate shots to the head, neck and chest. The march was led by the Mothers of April Movement, the Student Movement 19 April, civil society and private enterprise.

On 8 July, at least 38 were killed during skirmishes between protesters, authorities and pro-Sandinista paramilitary groups, raising the death toll to more than 300 Nicaraguans killed since the beginning of protests. Police and paramilitaries attacked the Rubén Darío University Campus (RURD) of the UNAN Managua on 13 July. After hours of facing attacks, more than 100 students took refuge in the nearby Church of Divine Mercy where they were fired upon by police and paramilitaries, after the youths left the facilities the paramilitaries set fire to the university campus setting fire to a CDI and one of the pavilions of the college The Church of Divine Mercy was then the target of attacks and was besieged throughout the night of 13th and into the early morning of the 14th, leaving two students dead. The bullet holes in the walls, windows and religious objects in addition to the bloodstains were still visible in the days following the attack.

As a result of crackdowns in July 2018, the government forced people from protest centers and established a firmer presence, though protests still continued in the following months.

The international community intensified pressure on the Government of Nicaragua on 16 July in order to stop the repression and disarm the paramilitaries. The United States, 13 Latin American countries and the Secretary-General of the UN, António Guterres, demanded Ortega end the repression of the demonstration. The Office of the United Nations High Commissioner for Human Rights also denounced the Law on Terrorism that was recently approved by the pro-Ortega Parliament of Nicaragua, which it said can be used to criminalize peaceful protests.

Cyberattacks 
Anonymous Nicaragua, part of the Anonymous movement, joined the protests against the government and launched Operación Nicaragua or #OpNicaragua,.a campaign of cyber attacks against Nicaragua's government web pages or accused to be related to it. The campaign started on 26 April with an attack that left the National Assembly website out of service. The attacks continued against the websites of Juventud Presidente, Canal 2, and the Office of the Attorney General of the Republic, the Nicaraguan Institute of Civil Aeronautics, Nicaraguan Institute of Culture, El 19 Digital or Canal 6.

The state agency Nicaraguan Institute of Telecommunications and Postal Services (TELCOR) cited the corporations that provide the internet service to see what actions to take to form unity against hackers. TELCOR summoned these providers to a meeting to address security measures to take around the cyber-attacks executed by the international hackers against web portals of the government and private corporations.

Teacher dismissals 
The dismissal of state teachers who support the demonstrations against the government caused an act of "student disobedience" in the city of Condega, in the north of Nicaragua, which is going through a crisis that has left between 317 and 448 dead since last April. Marist Institute students refused to enter the classrooms, in rejection of the decision of the Ministry of Education (Mined) to dismiss several of their professors "because they have their own criteria and do not support the murderers", informed the Student Movement 19 of April-Condega.

Aftermath 
An early-September general lockout organized to demand the release of political prisoners saw 90% participation of businesses in Nicaragua. It was estimated that the national lockout cost the country $20 million to $25 million per day. In December 2018, the government revoked the licenses of five human rights organizations, closed the offices of the cable news and online show Confidencial, and beat journalists when they protested.

The Confidential newspaper and other media were seized and taken by the government of Daniel Ortega
Several service stations of the Puma brand were closed in the afternoon of 20 December by representatives of the Nicaraguan Energy Institute (INE), a state entity that has the mandate to regulate, among others, the hydrocarbons sector. Puma Energy entered the Nicaraguan oil and fuel derivatives market at the end of March 2011, when it bought the entire network of Esso stations in Nicaragua as part of a regional operation that involved the purchase of 290 service stations and eight storage terminals of fuel in four countries of Central America.

On 21 December 2018, the Nicaraguan police raided the offices of the 100% News Channel. They arrested Miguel Mora, owner of the Canal; Lucía Pineda, Head of Press of 100% Noticias; and Verónica Chávez, wife of Miguel Mora and host of the Ellas Lo Dicen Program. Subsequently, Verónica Chávez was released.

325 people were killed as of 6 February 2019 as a result of the Nicaraguan government's repression of protests.

2019 
Police arrested 107 protestors at march in Managua on 16 March 2019.

The Nicaraguan Ministry of the Interior reported the death of the 57-year-old political prisoner Eddy Antonio Montes Praslin due to a shot by a prison guard when they "allegedly" controlled a riot, the events happened during a visit of the International Red Cross . The death of this prisoner provoked protests at the head of the La Modelo Prison by relatives of political prisoners who want to know about the physical state of the detainees from the Sandinista government.

On 11 June 2019, several political prisoners were released. Among them were the journalists Miguel Mora Barberena and Lucía Pineda Ubau, the peasant leader Medardo Mairena and the student leader Edwin Carcache.

On Sunday 16 June 2019, after a thanksgiving Mass for the release of political prisoners in the Managua Cathedral, there was a protest on the grounds of that temple which was attacked by the police with tear gas and rubber bullets. The protesters took refuge behind the perimeter wall of the cathedral.

2020 events

See also 

 Protests against Nicolás Maduro

References

External links

2018
2018 Nicaraguan protests
2018 in Nicaragua
2019 in Nicaragua
2020 in Nicaragua
2021 in Nicaragua
2022 in Nicaragua
2019 protests
2020 protests
2021 protests
2022 protests